The Victoria Hospital for Children, which later merged into St George's Hospital, was a hospital in Tite Street, London.

History
The hospital was established at Gough House in Tite Street as the South Western London Hospital for Children in October 1866. It was renamed the Victoria Hospital for Sick Children a month later when the out-patients department opened and then became the Victoria Hospital for Children in 1905. It joined the National Health Service in 1948 under the management of St George's Hospital. After services were transferred to St George's Hospital, it closed in 1964. The building was demolished in 1966. The site is now occupied by St Wilfrid's Convent and Home.

References 

Defunct hospitals in London
Chelsea, London